A Daughter of Two Worlds is a surviving 1920 silent film adventure drama directed by James Young and starring Norma Talmadge, Jack Crosby, and Virginia Lee.

Plot
As described in a film magazine, Jennie Malone (Talmadge), daughter of prominent underworld figure Black Jerry Malone (Sheridan), is arrested for forgery. A friend of her father's pays her bail, and she is sent to boarding school, jumping the bail. There she is educated and becomes a lady. At the home of her friend Sue Harrison (Lee), a daughter of wealth, she meets and falls in love with Kenneth Harrison (Cosby), and they become engaged. Then Harry Edwards (Rooney), an acquaintance and would be sweetheart of her former world, appears and urges her to return to his element. Slim Jackson (Shea), a dancer, to shield whom Jennie had shouldered the charge of forgery, seeks to collect money from her on threat of exposure. Her father thrashes the young man and bids him to leave her alone. A detective is murdered and Harry Edwards is convicted of the crime and sentenced to death. Jennie alone can save him by telling the truth that he was with her when the shot was fired. She confesses the truth to the Harrisons and saves Edwards, and then returns to her father's house to live. It is at this point the happy ending comes with the Harrisons reaching through the social barrier between them.

Cast
 Norma Talmadge as Jennie Malone
 Jack Crosby as Kenneth Harrison
 Virginia Lee as Sue Harrison
 William Shea as Slim Jackson
 Frank Sheridan as Black Jerry Malone
 Joseph W. Smiley as Sam Conway
 Gilbert Rooney as Harry Edwards
 Charles Slattery as Sergeant Casey
 E. J. Ratcliffe as John Harrison
 Winifred Harris as Mrs. Harrison
 Millicent Martin as Gloria Raymon
 Ned Burton as Uncle George

Preservation status
Prints are housed at the Library of Congress and UCLA Film and Television Archive.

References

External links

 

1920 films
American silent feature films
Films directed by James Young
American black-and-white films
American adventure drama films
1920s adventure drama films
1920 drama films
1920s American films
Silent American drama films
Silent adventure films
1920s English-language films